The Qualifications and Credit Framework (QCF) Level 3/4 Certificate in Teaching in the Lifelong Learning Sector (CTLLS) is an initial teacher training qualification, studied at QCF Level 3 or 4, for teaching in Further Education (FE) and the lifelong learning sector of education in the United Kingdom.

The CTLLS is the second highest of the teaching qualifications specifically for this sector of education, the others being the Diploma in Teaching in the Lifelong Learning Sector (DTLLS) and the Preparing to Teach in the Lifelong Learning Sector (PTLLS), qualifications all of which were introduced in 2007 and later updated in 2011.

The QCF Level 4 Certificate in Teaching in the Lifelong Learning Sector qualification (CTLLS), will be replaced with the Level 4 Certificate in Education and Training qualification.

References 

Educational qualifications in the United Kingdom
Teacher training